György Gémesi (born 3 January 1956) is a Hungarian doctor and politician. He is the current Mayor of Gödöllő since 1990 and the President of New Start Party (Új Kezdet). Between 1998 and 2006 was Member of the National Parliament of Hungary. He represented the Constituency of Gödöllő, as a Member of the Hungarian Democratic Forum. He is the President of the Alliance of Hungarian Local-Governments (since 1991).

Career 

Gémesi worked between 1980 and 1985 as doctor in National Institute of Physical Education and Sports Health. After, he worked between 1985 and 1990 in Hospital Ferenc Flór. 
In August 1989 stepped in Hungarian Democratic Forum (MDF).
In October 1990, as the candidate of the Hungarian Democratic Forum, elected Mayor. The people of Gödöllő re-elected in 1994, 1998, 2002, 2006, 2010 and 2014 too. 
He was in 1991 the one of the founders than the Alliance of Hungarian Local-Governments. 
It was in 1994 the Member of Party's National Committee. It was in 1994 the Vice-President of MDF, his task was the local-government affairs. Between March 1996 and May 2000, he worked as the Manager-President. It was in February 2003 the Vice-President of Party, his task was the communication, then from August his task was the campaign management for election of the European Parliament. 
In 2006 resigned from the Vice-Presidency.
In 2017 announced at the city's celebration of Gödöllő, that found a new party. The new political organization's name is "New Start" (Új Kezdet)

Personal life
He is divorced and has two daughters, Márta and Gabriella and a son, Gergely.

References

Sources 

 Adatlapja az Országgyűlés honlapján
 Személyes honlapja 

1956 births
Hungarian physicians
Hungarian Democratic Forum politicians
New Start (Hungary) politicians
Members of the National Assembly of Hungary (1998–2002)
Members of the National Assembly of Hungary (2002–2006)
Members of the National Assembly of Hungary (2018–2022)
Mayors of places in Hungary
People from Gödöllő
Living people
European Democratic Party